Sărulești is a commune in Buzău County, Muntenia, Romania. It is composed of seven villages: Cărătnău de Jos, Cărătnău de Sus, Goicelu, Sările-Cătun, Sărulești, Valea Largă-Sărulești and Valea Stânei.

Notes

Communes in Buzău County
Localities in Muntenia